Djerma may refer to:
 Djerma people, an ethnic group of Niger and neighbouring countries
 Djerma language, a Songhai language of West Africa
 Djerma, Algeria, a town in Algeria
 Djerma (Libya), an archaeological site in Libya
 Djerma (horse), a horse breed

See also 
 Jerma (disambiguation)
 Germa (disambiguation)

Language and nationality disambiguation pages